Barry Swift (born 11 November 1976 in Port of Spain, Trinidad) is a former association football player who had a brief spell at the NY/NJ MetroStars during the 1998 season and played for Maryland Mania in the A-League in 1999.

References

1979 births
Living people
Association football forwards
American soccer players
Expatriate footballers in Brunei
New York Red Bulls players
MLS Pro-40 players
Maryland Mania players
Major League Soccer players
A-League (1995–2004) players
DPMM FC players
Trinidad and Tobago footballers